Florence MacMoyer (fl. 1662 – 12 February 1713), a native of Ballymoyer, County Armagh, Ireland was the last hereditary keeper of the Book of Armagh, a 9th-century Irish manuscript written mainly in Latin. The document is valuable for containing early texts relating to St Patrick and some of the oldest surviving specimens of Old Irish, and for being one of the earliest manuscripts produced by an insular church to contain a near complete copy of the New Testament.

Life
The MacMoyer family had lived at Ballymacmoyer since the 14th century. Florence was born at Ballymyre and became a schoolteacher.

He pawned the book for five pounds.
He used this money to travel to London to give evidence at the trial of Archbishop of Armagh, Oliver Plunkett, with his cousin, Friar John MacMoyer.

Florence MacMoyer was imprisoned for some time after his return to Ireland, and was unable to reclaim the Book of Armagh. He died in 1713 and was buried in Ballymoyer Old Graveyard. A headstone marking his grave was later moved into Ballymoyer House.

Book of Armagh
A Compendium of Irish Biography relates:

References

Further reading
 Walk of the week: Ballymoyer Woodland Walk - Life & Style - Belfasttelegraph.co.uk
 The Dictionary of Ulster Biography
 Florence MacMoyer
 BBC – Northern Ireland – A Short History

1713 deaths
People from County Armagh
17th-century Irish people
18th-century Irish people
Year of birth unknown